Uppsala Auktionskammare was founded in 1731 and is the third oldest auction house in the world after Göteborgs Auktionsverk and before Sotheby's. It is also the third largest auction house in Sweden and organizes international quality auctions with Dutch & Flemish Old Masters, Russian, and Chinese art.

In 1996, it was taken over by Knut Knutson and former employees.

In 2009, it acquired the Crafoord auctions in Lund. The company has offices in Stockholm, Gothenburg, and Uppsala.

Magnus Bexhed has been the president since 2011.

References

External links 
 Uppsala auktionskammares website

Retail companies established in 1731
Swedish auction houses